Shoplifting is the debut studio album by the Bristol-based indie rock group Straw.

Track listing

Personnel
Straw
Mattie Bennett - Vocals/Guitar
Roger Power - Bass
Mark "Duck" Blackwell - Keyboard
Andy Nixon - Drums

References

1999 debut albums
Straw (band) albums